John Worrall may refer to:
Jack Worrall (1861–1937), Australian rules footballer
John Worrall (cricketer) (1927–2012), New Zealand cricketer
John Worrall (philosopher) (born 1946), professor of philosophy of science at the London School of Economics
John Worrall (RAF officer) (1911–1988), World War II RAF fighter pilot
John Worrall (criminologist), American criminologist